Astacoides petiti is a species of southern crawfish in the family Parastacidae.

References

Further reading

 
 

Parastacidae
Articles created by Qbugbot
Crustaceans described in 1987